The women's sport sambo 48 kilograms competition at the 2018 Asian Games in Jakarta was held on 31 August 2018 at the Jakarta Convention Center Assembly Hall.

Schedule
All times are Western Indonesia Time (UTC+07:00)

Results
Legend
SU — Won by submission
TT — Won by total throw

Main bracket

Repechage

References

External links
Official website

Sambo at the 2018 Asian Games